Behind The Player: Blasko is an Interactive Music Video featuring Ozzy Osbourne bassist Rob "Blasko" Nicholson. Released on November 1, 2008 by IMV, the DVD features Blasko giving in-depth bass lessons for how to play "Dragula" by Rob Zombie and "I Don't Wanna Stop" by Ozzy Osbourne and an intimate behind-the scenes look at his life as a professional musician, including rare photos and video.  The DVD also includes Blasko jamming the two tracks with Rob Zombie drummer Tommy Clufetos, VideoTab that shows exactly how Blasko plays his parts in the two songs, as well as other bonus material.

IMV donates $.25 from the sale of each Behind the Player DVD to Little Kids Rock, an organization that gets instruments in the hands of underprivileged kids.

Contents
Behind The Player
Blasko talks about his background, influences and gear, including rare photos and video

"Dragula" by Rob Zombie
Lesson: Blasko gives an in-depth bass lesson for how to play the song
Jam: Blasko jams the track with Rob Zombie drummer Tommy Clufetos
VideoTab: Animated tablature shows exactly how Blasko plays the track

"I Don't Wanna Stop" by Ozzy Osbourne
Lesson: Blasko gives an in-depth bass lesson for how to play the song
Jam: Blasko jams the track with Rob Zombie drummer Tommy Clufetos
VideoTab: Animated tablature shows exactly how Blasko plays the track

Special features
Blasko Jams "American Witch" by Rob Zombie with Tommy Clufetos 
Sharon Osbourne Charity
Little Kids Rock promotional video

Personnel

Produced By: Ken Mayer & Sean E Demott
Directed By: Leon Melas
Executive Producer: Kim Jordan & Marc Reiser
Director Of Photography: Ken Barrows
Sound Engineer: Will Thompson
Edited By: Jeff Morose
Sound Mix By: Matt Chidgey & Cedrick Courtois
Graphics By: Thayer Demay
Tab Transcription By: Thayer Demay

Camera Operators: Tom Gertsch, Grant Smith, Jethro Rothe-Kushal
Gaffer: Ken Jenkins
Assistant Director: Matt Pick
Production Assistant: Laine Proctor
Lighting And Grip: Mcnulty Nielson
Artist Hospitality: Sasha Mayer
Shot At: The Chop Shop, Hollywood
Special Guest: Tommy Clufetos
Cover Photo By: Johnny Indovina
Video Courtesy Of: John 5, Rob Zombie, The Chop Shop
Photos Courtesy Of: Neil Zlozower, Will Thompson, Shector Guitars, Johnny Indovina, The Chop Shop

References

External links
Official website

2008 video albums
Charity albums
Ozzy Osbourne albums